Ingrid Beazley FRSA (17 January 1950 – 21 April 2017) was an art museum curator, author, editor, and educationist, based in Dulwich, south London, England. She was a pioneer in promoting street art.

Life and work
Beazley was the daughter of a doctor, Ian Marrable, and his wife Kari. She grew up in Dodoma, Tanganyika (now Tanzania), East Africa. The family moved to England when she was 12 and she was educated at Guildford County School. She studied for a BA in Art History and Psychology at the University of St Andrews, then at the University of London,  and later for a Cert Ed at a teacher training college in Gloucestershire.

Beazley worked at a number of schools in Singapore and the United Kingdom. Later she was based in the education department at Dulwich Picture Gallery, where she promoted the use of technology. She established an associated community-run blog-based online magazine, Dulwich OnView, and contributed and edited articles. Beazley was also Chairman of the Friends of Dulwich Picture Gallery from 2005 to 2008 and in total won nine national and international awards for her work at the gallery.

In 2012, the street artist Stik collaborated with Beazley through Dulwich Picture Gallery to recreate Old Master pictures displayed in the gallery using his own street art style on the streets of Dulwich. In 2013, Beazley then established Dulwich Outdoor Gallery, a distributed set of street art in Dulwich by international street artists (including Conor Harrington, MadC, Mear One, Thierry Noir, Nunca, Phlegm, Reka One, Remi Rough and System, and ROA), with works based on traditional Baroque paintings in Dulwich Picture Gallery.

Beazley authored a related book on street art, Street Art, Fine Art. She also worked with Google's Street Art project.

In 2020, Martin Aveling established the 'Ingrid Beazley Award' in her memory. The award comprises a £5,000 grant designed to support wildlife conservation, stimulate creativity and support people suffering with eco-anxiety. It is awarded to the winner of the 'Human Impact' category (open to artists 16 - 22 years) at the David Shepherd Wildlife Foundation's 'Wildlife Artist of the Year' competition.

Publication
Street Art, Fine Art. London: Heni, 2015. .

References

1950 births
2017 deaths
People from Guildford
English people of Norwegian descent
Alumni of the University of St Andrews
Alumni of the University of London
People from Dulwich
English curators
English non-fiction writers
English editors
Schoolteachers from Surrey
British art curators
Deaths from cancer in England
British women curators